The Singles Collection is a greatest hits album by English new wave band Spandau Ballet, released on 4 November 1985 by Chrysalis Records. The album peaked at number three on the UK Albums Chart and was certified double platinum by the British Phonographic Industry (BPI) within six weeks of release. It is the band's best-selling album in the United Kingdom, though despite its success, the album was released without the band's approval as they were leaving Chrysalis Records and signed to CBS Records for their next album.

Track listing
All tracks are composed by Gary Kemp.

"Gold" – 3:54
"Lifeline" – 3:21
"Round and Round" – 4:34
"Only When You Leave" – 4:48
"Instinction" – 3:35
"Highly Strung" – 4:10
"True" – 5:36
"Communication" – 3:25
"I'll Fly for You" – 5:10
"To Cut a Long Story Short" – 3:20
"Chant No. 1 (I Don't Need This Pressure On)" – 4:06
"She Loved Like Diamond" – 2:55
"Paint Me Down" – 3:43
"The Freeze" – 3:30
"Muscle Bound" – 3:58

The 12″ Collection
Some copies of the vinyl album contained an extra record. This disc was composed of 12″ remixes and extended versions. This was somewhat similar to Ultravox's The Collection a year earlier.

Side one
"To Cut a Long Story Short – 6:30
"Chant No. 1 (I Don't Need This Pressure On) (Remix) – 8:03
"Glow – 8:10

Side two
"Communication (Club Mix) – 4:28
"Gold (Extended Version) – 7:12
"Highly Restrung – 5:27

Charts

Weekly charts

Year-end charts

Certifications

References

Bibliography

 

1985 greatest hits albums
Chrysalis Records compilation albums
Spandau Ballet albums